The 1919–20 Ottawa Senators season was the club's 35th season of play and third season in the NHL. It was a very successful season, as they set an NHL record for wins (19), points (38), and won both halves of the season, therefore the Sens automatically were awarded the NHL championship and the right to play in the Stanley Cup Finals. The Senators defeated Seattle to win their eighth Stanley Cup title.

Regular season

The Quebec Bulldogs team was relaunched and added to the league and the schedule changed from 18 games to 24.  Also, the Toronto Arenas would get new ownership and be renamed the Toronto St. Pats.

Frank Nighbor led the Sens offensively with 26 goals, good for 3rd in the NHL, and his 33 points ranked him 4th.  Clint Benedict would set an NHL record with 5 shutouts, and he led the league in both wins (19) and GAA (2.66).

December
 December 23 – The Senators opened the 1919-20 season on home ice against the newly renamed Toronto St. Patricks. Frank Nighbor, Punch Broadbent and Jack Darragh each scored a goal while Clint Benedict recorded the shutout in a 3-0 Senators victory.

December 27 - Ottawa played their first road game of the season at Mount Royal Arena against the Montreal Canadiens. Sprague Cleghorn led the team offensively with a goal and an assist and Clint Benedict recorded his second straight shutout as the Senators defeated the Canadiens 2-0.

Ottawa finished December with a 2-0-0 record, earning four points. The Senators were in first place in the NHL, as second place Toronto also had four points, however, they had played more games by the end of December.

January
 January 1 – The Senators opened the 1920's on the road in Quebec City for their first ever game against the Quebec Bulldogs at Quebec Arena.  Jack Darragh, Frank Nighbor and Cy Denneny each scored a goal as the Senators extended their winning streak to three games as they beat the Bulldogs 3-2.

January 3 - Ottawa made their first visit to Mutual Street Arena in Toronto for a meeting against the Toronto St. Patricks. Jack Darragh and Frank Nighbor each scored a goal and an assist, however, the Senators saw their three game winning streak snapped with a 4-3 loss to Toronto.

January 7 - The Senators returned home for a matchup against the Montreal Canadiens. Punch Broadbent scored three goals and an assist, all in the first period, as Ottawa held on for a 4-3 win over Montreal.

January 10 - The Quebec Bulldogs made their first ever visit to Ottawa. After a scoreless first period, the Senators scored three in the second period, followed by four in the third in a 7-1 win over Quebec. Jack Darragh scored three goals in the win.

January 14 - The Senators were on the road to Quebec City for the second game of a home-and-home series against the Quebec Bulldogs. Sprague Cleghorn and Frank Nighbor each scored for the Senators, while Clint Benedict was very solid in a 2-1 victory.

January 17 - Ottawa continued their road trip with a game against the Montreal Canadiens. Punch Broadbent scored both of the Senators goals, however, Amos Arbour scored the winning goal for the Canadiens late in the third period as the Senators lost the game 3-2.

January 21 - The Senators returned home for a matchup against the Quebec Bulldogs. Both Sprague Cleghorn and Frank Nighbor scored three goals and an assist, while Punch Broadbent and Jack Darragh each scored twice, as the Senators demolished the Bulldogs 12-1.

January 24 - Ottawa was back on the road with a game in Toronto against their provincial rivals, the Toronto St. Patricks. Sprague Cleghorn led the Senators offensively with a goal and an assist, however, Cully Wilson scored twice for the St. Patricks as the Senators lost the game 5-3.

January 28 - The Senators returned home for the second game of a home-and-home series against the Toronto St. Patricks. Ottawa was led by Punch Broadbent, who scored two goals and two assists, while Clint Benedict stopped every shot he faced, as the Senators shutout Toronto 7-0.

January 31 - The Montreal Canadiens came into Ottawa for the final game of the first half of the season. Both clubs had identical 8-3-0 records and the winning team would earn a berth in the NHL championship. Punch Broadbent scored three goals, Frank Nighbor scored two goals and four assists, and Jack Darragh scored twice and earned three assists as the Senators humiliated the Canadiens by a score of 11-3 and clinch first place in the first half of the season.

February
 February 4 – The Senators opened the second half of the season on the road against the Quebec Bulldogs. Sprague Cleghorn scored twice while Clint Benedict earned the shutout as the Senators defeated the Bulldogs 5-0.

February 7 - Ottawa returned home for their first home game of the second half of the season against the Toronto St. Patricks. Frank Nighbor scored twice and earned an assist, however, it wasn't enough as the Senators lost the game 4-3.

February 11 - The Montreal Canadiens visited Ottawa for the first time in the second half of the season. Jack Darragh scored his second and tie-breaking goal of the game late in the third period, as the Senators defeated the Canadiens 4-3.

February 14 - The Senators travelled to Montreal to complete a home-and-home series with the Montreal Canadiens. Sprague Cleghorn and Frank Nighbor each scored as the game was tied 2-2 heading into overtime. In the extra period, Cy Denneny scored 1:30 into the extra period, as the Senators defeated the Canadiens 3-2.

February 18 - The Senators returned home to face a struggling Quebec Bulldogs club. Cy Denneny scored three goals and an assist, while Sprague Cleghorn and Jack Darragh each scored twice as the Senators easily defeated Quebec 9-3.

February 21 - Ottawa was back on the road for a game against the Toronto St. Patricks. Sprague Cleghorn and Jack Darragh each scored twice to lead the Senators to a 5-3 win over the Toronto St. Patricks.

February 25 - Back on home ice, the Senators faced the Montreal Canadiens. Jack Darragh scored twice and added two assists, while Frank Nighbor had a goal and two assists as Ottawa defeated the Canadiens 6-3.

February 28 - Ottawa closed out the month of February back on the road in Toronto for a matchup against the Toronto St. Patricks. Frank Nighbor scored a shorthanded goal, while Clint Benedict earned the shutout, as the Senators defeated the St. Patricks 1-0.

The Senators finished February with a 7-1-0 record, earning 14 points, and sitting in first place in the second half standings.

March
 March 3 – Ottawa returned home for the second game of a home-and-home series against the Toronto St. Patricks. Cy Denneny and Eddie Gerard each scored two goals and Frank Nighbor scored a goal and two assists as the Senators extended their winning streak to seven games with a 7-4 victory.

March 6 - The Senators visited the Montreal Canadiens for the final time of the season. Frank Nighbor scored three goals, including the overtime winner, as Ottawa defeated Montreal 4-3 to extend their winning streak to eight games.

March 8 - Ottawa was back at home for a game against the Quebec Bulldogs. The Bulldogs held a 5-4 lead in the third period, however, the Senators scored seven goals in the final 11:30 of the game to defeat Quebec 11-6. Eddie Gerard had three goals and two assists, Frank Nighbor scored three goals and an assist, while Cy Denneny also scored three goals to lead the Senators. With the win, the club extended their winning streak to nine games and clinched first place for the second half of the season.

March 10 - The Senators travelled to Quebec for their final game of the regular season against the Quebec Bulldogs. As the Senators had clinched first place, they rested some players in the season finale. The Bulldogs took advantage and snapped the Senators nine game winning streak with a 10-4 victory. Quebec's Joe Malone scored six goals.

Overall, Ottawa had a record of 3-1-0 in March. The Senators won the second half of the NHL season as they posted a league best 10-2-0 record, earning 20 points.

Final standings

Record vs. opponents

Playoffs
Ottawa won both halves of the schedule, and no NHL playoffs were played.

Stanley Cup Finals

Ottawa Senators 3, Seattle Metropolitans 2

The Senators would face the Seattle Metropolitans for the Stanley Cup, with all games scheduled to be played in Ottawa.  However an unseasonably warm spring in the Ottawa area led to some problems with the ice at Dey's Arena, and the final two games were moved to Toronto's Arena Gardens, which had artificial ice equipment.

Game 1 - The series opened on March 22 in Ottawa. The Metropolitans Frank Foyston scored the lone goal of the first period, giving Seattle a 1-0 lead over the Senators. Foyston scored his second goal of the game 5:46 into the second period, as Seattle went up 2-0. Frank Nighbor finally got Ottawa on the scoreboard with a goal 14:15 into the second period, cutting the Metropolitans lead to 2-1. In the third period, Nighbor scored his second goal of the game 10:00 into the period, tying the game 2-2. The Senators Jack Darragh scored with 4:00 remaining in the game, as Ottawa held on to a 3-2 win and a 1-0 series lead.

Game 2 - The second game was played in Ottawa on March 24. The Senators Jack Darragh scored the only goal of the first period, as Ottawa took a 1-0 into the first intermission. Neither team scored in the second period, as this was a very tightly defensive game. In the third period, Eddie Gerard scored 6:00 into the period, giving Ottawa a 2-0 lead. Frank Nighbor scored a late goal, as the Senators shutout the Metropolitans 3-0 and took a commanding 2-0 series lead.

Game 3 - The third game was played on March 27 in Ottawa, as the Senators could close out the series and win the Stanley Cup with a victory. The Senators Georges Boucher got Ottawa on the board first with a goal 5:00 into the game. The Metropolitans Frank Foyston replied with his third goal of the series three minutes later, tying the game 1-1 after the first period. In the second period, Foyston scored once again, as Seattle took a 2-1 lead into the third period. The Metropolitans Roy Rickey scored the only goal of the third period, as the Senators couldn't beat Hap Holmes. Seattle won the game 3-1 and cut the Senators series lead to 2-1.

Game 4 - The fourth game was moved to Arena Gardens in Toronto due to ice problems in Ottawa on March 30. The Metropolitans used this to their advantage, as they took a 2-0 lead after the first period. Frank Nighbor brought the Senators to within a goal as he scored 2:00 into the second period, however, the Metropolitans responded with a goal six minutes later, taking a 3-1 lead in the game. Ottawa would once again bring the game to within a goal by the end of the period, as Nighbor scored his second of the game, making it 3-2 Seattle after two periods. In the third period, the Metropolitans scored two goals, including the sixth of the series by Frank Foyston, as they won the game 5-2 and tied the series up at 2-2.

Game 5 - The fifth and deciding game was played in Toronto on April 1. The Metropolitans Bobby Rowe gave Seattle an early 1-0 lead with a goal 10:00 into the first period, however, the Senators Georges Boucher tied the game four minutes later, making it 1-1 after the first period. The teams skated to a scoreless second period, as the game remained tied heading into the third period. Ottawa's Jack Darragh broke the tie with a goal 5:00 into the period, giving Ottawa a 2-1 lead. At the 10:00 mark of the period, the Senators took a 3-1 lead after a goal by Eddie Gerard. Darragh then scored two goals within a minute, giving the Senators a 5-1 lead. Frank Nighbor closed out the scoring with a goal 30 seconds after Darragh's second goal, as Ottawa crushed the Metropolitans 6-1 to clinch the Stanley Cup for the first time since the club joined the NHL.

 Game 4 and Game 5 played at Arena Gardens in Toronto, Ontario.

Schedule and results

Player statistics

Scoring leaders

Goaltending

Awards and records 

 NHL champion (O'Brien Cup not awarded)

Transactions
The Senators were involved in the following transactions during the 1919–20 season.

Trades

Free agents

See also
 1919–20 NHL season
 List of Stanley Cup champions

References
SHRP Sports
The Internet Hockey Database
National Hockey League Guide & Record Book 2007

Stanley Cup championship seasons
Ottawa Senators (original) seasons
Ottawa Senators season, 1919-20
Ottawa